The Swedenborgian Church is a historic church complex at 2107 Lyon Street in the Pacific Heights neighborhood of San Francisco, California.  Built in 1895 for a Swedenborgian congregation, it is considered one of California's earliest pure Arts and Crafts buildings, with design contributions by  A. C. Schweinfurth, A. Page Brown, Bernard Maybeck, William Keith, and Bruce Porter.  It was designated a National Historic Landmark in 2004.

Architecture and building history
The Swedenborgian Church is located at the northwest corner of Lyon and Washington Streets in San Francisco's Pacific Heights neighborhood, on a lot that has been leveled by fill held by a stuccoed retaining wall.  The complex is basically rectangular, housing the church, parsonage, and parish house amid landscaped gardens.  It is accessed by an arched portico, flanked by similar arched openings, which form a sort of portico in front of the sanctuary facing Lyon Street, covered by a tile roof.  The sanctuary is a single-story structure, with a thick walls finished with a variety of colored and textured bricks.  The gabled roof is supported by heavy timbers, which are exposed on the inside.  The doors into the sanctuary are made of dark tongue-and-groove oak boards, and are fastened by hand-wrought iron hinges.  The interior of the main sanctuary is dominated by massive timbers, mainly madrone clad in Douglas fir wainscoting.

The first pastor of the church was Rev. Joseph Worcester (May 20, 1836 - August 4, 1913), who bought the land and worked with the architects to design the church. Contributions were made to the plans by A. C. Schweinfurth, A. Page Brown, Bernard Maybeck, William Keith, and Bruce Porter.  The then-nascent Arts and Crafts movement was viewed by Worcester as harmonizing particularly well with Swedenborgian teachings about harmonizing man with nature.  The church opened for worship March 17, 1895.  It remains essentially the same as when it was built.

See also
National Register of Historic Places listings in San Francisco
List of National Historic Landmarks in California

References

3. Building with Nature: Inspiration for the Arts & Crafts Home (Gibbs Smith, Nov. 2005), Chapter 3 is devoted to the church.

External links
Swedenborgian Church of San Francisco web site

Swedenborgian churches in California
Churches in San Francisco
19th-century Swedenborgian church buildings
Churches completed in 1895
Churches on the National Register of Historic Places in California
National Register of Historic Places in San Francisco
National Historic Landmarks in the San Francisco Bay Area
Bernard Maybeck buildings
Arts and Crafts architecture in California
American Craftsman architecture in California